Desiree "Des" Nicole Linden (née Davila; born July 26, 1983) is an American long-distance runner. She represented the United States in the 2012 London Olympics and the 2016 Rio de Janeiro Olympics women's marathon. In 2018, she won the Boston Marathon, becoming the first American in 33 years to win the woman's category in the event. She holds the women's 50K world record of 2:59:54.

Early career
Desiree Davila was born in San Diego, California.

High school
In high school Davila ran track and cross country, and played soccer. She ran a sub-5 minute mile as a high school freshman and graduated from Hilltop High School in 2001. At the CIF California State Meet she was a finalist all four years.  In both 1998 and 1999 she was 8th in the 1600. 1999 saw her also attempt to double in the 800 meters, finishing last after being depleted from the 1600. In 2000, she improved that to 5th.  Her best finish was 4th in 2001 in the 3200.

College
Linden studied psychology at Arizona State University, and was a two time All-American in track and cross country. She finished third at the 2005 Pac-10 5,000m Collegiate Championships (16:59.93).

Professional career
Linden runs for the Hansons-Brooks Distance Project in Michigan. She is represented by agent Josh Cox and is sponsored by Coros Global, Powerbar, Oakley, Boston Beer Company, and Brooks Running.

Career highlights:

2006–07
 In the Road Running World Championships 2006 in Debrecen she finished in 43rd place.
 Her first appearance in a marathon was at the 2007 Boston Marathon, where she placed 19th in 2:44:56.
 In the 2007 IAAF World Road Running Championships in Udine in 34th.

2008–09
 Linden finished second at the 2008 Houston Half Marathon and ran her personal best time of 1:12:10.  This time qualified her for the 2008 U.S. Olympic Marathon Team Trials.
 At the U.S. Olympic Trials in Boston in 2008, she finished 13th in 2:37:50.
 Later at the track portion of the Olympic Trials in Eugene, she ran tenaciously with the leaders of the 10,000 meters before fading to 11th.
 At the 2008 Chicago Marathon, Linden finished 5th in 2:31:33.
 On August 23, 2009 Linden finished tenth at the IAAF World Championship in the marathon and set a personal record by 3 minutes. Her time of 2:27:53 was the second-fastest American woman.

2010–11
 She finished second at the 2010 Chicago Marathon, setting a personal record by one minute. Her time of 2:26:20 was the fastest American woman.
 Linden came in third at the 2010 USA Championships 10,000m (32:22.32)
 Linden finished second at the 2011 Boston Marathon by just two seconds and set a personal record by four minutes. Her time of 2:22:38 was then the fastest time ever run by an American woman in the Boston Marathon. After her success in Boston she was invited to throw the first pitch at a Detroit Tigers game.

2012–13
 She finished second in the U.S. Olympic Marathon Trials January 14, 2012 in Houston, TX with a time of 2:25:55. which qualified her to run the marathon at the 2012 London Summer Olympics on August 5, 2012, but did not finish. Her Olympic failure was attributed to a stress fracture of the femur.
 2013 marked her return to competition, finishing second at the USATF Half Marathon Championships. 
 At the 2013 Berlin Marathon, Davila finished fifth, winning her age group, in 2:29:15. For this accomplishment, she was selected the USATF Athlete of the Week.

2014–15
 She finished 10th at the 2014 Boston Marathon, in 2:23:54, second fastest American woman, behind Shalane Flanagan at 2:22:02.
 She finished 5th at the 2014 TCS New York City Marathon in 2:28:11, the fastest American woman.
 She finished 4th at the 2015 Boston Marathon, in 2:25:39, the fastest American woman.
 Desiree finished 6th in the 10,000 meters in 32:53.50 at 2015 USA Outdoor Track and Field Championships on June 25
 She won a silver medal at the 2015 Pan American Games 10,000 meters.  She led the majority of the race, which set up Brenda Flores to sprint past her on the final straightaway.

2016

 On 13 February 2016, she placed second, behind Amy Hastings, at the US Olympic Marathon Trials, finishing in 2:28:54 in Los Angeles, California.
 On April 30, she placed second, behind Tara Erdmann Welling at the USA Half Marathon Championships, finishing in 1:11:06 in Columbus, Ohio.
 August 14, Linden placed 7th at the Athletics at the 2016 Summer Olympics – Women's marathon in 2:26:08.

2017
 On March 19, she placed 7th at the New York Half Marathon, finishing in 1:11:05.
 On April 17, she finished 4th in the 2017 Boston Marathon, finishing in 2:25:06, with the leader Edna Kiplagat winning in 2:21:52.

2018

 On April 16, she placed 1st at the 2018 Boston Marathon, finishing in 2:39:55. She became the first American to win the category in 33 years.
 On November 4, she finished the 2018 New York City Marathon in 6th place with a time of 2:27:51.

2019
 On April 15, she placed 5th at the 2019 Boston Marathon.
 On November 3, she finished the 2019 New York City Marathon in 6th place with a time of 2:26:46.

2020
 On February 29, she placed 4th at the U.S. Olympic Marathon Trials with a time of 2:29:03.

2021
 On April 13, she completed a 50K in 2:59:54, becoming the first woman ever to run 50 km under 3 hours and breaking the world record (previously 3:07:20 by Aly Dixon on September 1, 2019). This was Linden's first ultramarathon.

2022
 On April 18, she completed the 2022 Boston Marathon in 2:28:47, taking 13th overall and 3rd among the American women.

Personal bests

Personal life
Linden is an aficionado of bourbon. One of her role models is Deena Kastor.

She married marathoner Ryan Linden in 2013.

References

External links
 
 
 
 
 Desireé Linden fan page at Facebook 
 Desireé Linden Hansons Brooks

1983 births
Living people
American female long-distance runners
American female marathon runners
Olympic track and field athletes of the United States
Arizona State Sun Devils women's track and field athletes
Athletes (track and field) at the 2012 Summer Olympics
Athletes (track and field) at the 2016 Summer Olympics
Track and field athletes from San Diego
Pan American Games silver medalists for the United States
Pan American Games medalists in athletics (track and field)
Boston Marathon female winners
Athletes (track and field) at the 2015 Pan American Games
Medalists at the 2015 Pan American Games
21st-century American women
20th-century American women